Peace is the second studio album by Bethel Music, and their nineteenth full-length overall. It was released on April 10, 2020, through its own imprint label, Bethel Music. The featured worship leaders on the album are Cory Asbury, Jonathan David & Melissa Helser, Josh Baldwin, Amanda Lindsey Cook, Brian Johnson, Jenn Johnson, with Kari Jobe and We The Kingdom appearing as guests. Ed Cash collaborated with and Steven Taylor in the production of the album.

Background
On April 9, 2020, Bethel Music announced that they will be releasing Peace at midnight of April 10 via social media. The album is the collective's second studio project since Tides (2013). The album is a collection of remixed versions of nine renowned worship songs and three original songs. The remixed songs included hits from the Bethel Music community such as "Reckless Love", "Goodness of God" and "Raise a Hallelujah" as well as popular songs by other contemporary worship artists such as Upperroom's "Surrounded (Fight My Battles)" and Elevation Worship's "The Blessing".

Recording, production
Ed Cash, spoke about the process of recording the album and the main aim of the record, saying:

Reception

Critical response

Joshua Andre in his 365 Days of Inspiring Media review described Peace as a "very layered and unique album," further commenting that it is "a brilliant album for a well-respected church and group!" Hallel's Timothy Yap gave a favourable review of the album, declaring that Peace lives up to its title and the collection of songs are "carefully curated, crafted and projected so that they function to bring us to worship God with a surrendered posture. And as a much-added bonus these songs are performed by a red carpet list of some of the best worship leaders."

Accolades

Commercial performance
In the United States, Peace launched at No. 85 on the mainstream Billboard 200 chart dated April 25, 2020, concurrently registering at No. 2 on Christian Albums chart, having earned 9,000 equivalent album units in the first week of sales. In the United Kingdom, Peace debuted at No. 3 on OCC's Official Christian & Gospel Albums Chart dated April 24, 2020.

Track listing

 Songwriting credits adapted from PraiseCharts.

Charts

Weekly charts

Year-end charts

Release history

References

External links
  on PraiseCharts
 

2020 albums
Bethel Music albums